Beretbina or Beretbinə may refer to:

Beretbina, Balakan, Azerbaijan
Beretbina, Zaqatala, Azerbaijan